City Primary School on Lenin Street is a building in Zheleznodorozhny City District of Novosibirsk, Russia. It was constructed in 1912. Architect: Andrey Kryachkov. The building is located on the corner of Lenin Street and Street of Revolution.

History
The City Primary School was built by the architect Andrey Kryachkov in 1912.

In 1997, the building was renovated and adapted for the puppet theater.

See also
 City Primary School on Krasnoyarskaya Street

References

External links
  Памятники истории, архитектуры и монументального искусства Новосибирской области.

Zheleznodorozhny City District, Novosibirsk
Buildings and structures in Novosibirsk
School buildings completed in 1912
1912 establishments in the Russian Empire
Cultural heritage monuments of regional significance in Novosibirsk Oblast